Deerfield Township is one of twenty-six townships in Fulton County, Illinois, USA.  As of the 2010 census, its population was 261 and it contained 137 housing units.

Geography

Extinct towns
 Blyton
 Midway is a small settlement south of Wiley church.
 Wiley was a town Emsley Wiley set a side  for a school & meeting house. He platted a city to be named Wiley but it did not materialize. His dream of a school & meeting house did and in 1839 the first rude log school was built. In 1844 Mr. & Mrs. Wiley sold their land & moved farther west, In 1880 the Wiley Lutheran Church was organized & still exists today along with the cemetery.
Westminster was a paper town founded by David Everly after they moved here coming from the east. Only 3 lots were sold but the village never materialized and so ceased to exist.

Cemeteries
The township contains these four cemeteries: Dickson, Wiley, Lamb & Roberts.

Major highways
  Illinois Route 9

Demographics

School districts
 Bushnell Prairie City Community Unit School District 170
 Community Unit School District 3 Fulton City
 Spoon River Valley Community Unit School District 4

Political districts
 Illinois' 17th congressional district
 State House District 94
 State Senate District 47

References
 
 United States Census Bureau 2007 TIGER/Line Shapefiles
 United States National Atlas

External links
 City-Data.com
 Illinois State Archives

Townships in Fulton County, Illinois
Townships in Illinois